Agnes Catharina Kant (born 20 January 1967) is a retired Dutch politician of the Socialist Party (SP). She was an MP from 1998 to 2010. She was also the parliamentary leader in the House of Representatives from 20 June 2008 until 4 March 2010. After suffering major losses in the municipal elections of 3 March 2010, she stepped down as parliamentary group leader and announced she would not be a candidate for re-election in the upcoming national elections.

References

External links
Official

  Dr. A.C. (Agnes) Kant Parlement & Politiek

1967 births
Living people
Dutch medical researchers
Dutch nonprofit executives
Dutch nonprofit directors
Cancer epidemiologists
Dutch public health doctors
Members of the House of Representatives (Netherlands)
Municipal councillors in Gelderland
Leaders of the Socialist Party (Netherlands)
People from Doesburg
People from Hameln-Pyrmont
Women epidemiologists
Radboud University Nijmegen alumni
Academic staff of Radboud University Nijmegen
Socialist Party (Netherlands) politicians
21st-century Dutch politicians
21st-century Dutch women politicians
Women public health doctors